İkizdere is a town in Rize Province in the Black Sea region of Turkey. It is the seat of İkizdere District. Its population is 1,875 (2021).

Etymology
Formerly known as Dipotamos and Kuray-ı Sab, İkizdere means "twin streams" in both the Pontic Greek and Turkish languages, and indeed the Çamlık and Cimil rivers meet here to form the İkizdere.

Demographics
There are four ethnic groups in the district: Greeks, Turks, Laz and Hemshin. The non-Turkic natives converted to Islam during the Ottoman period and during the population exchange between Greece and Turkey, the natives stayed in the area.

Geography
This is hilly countryside inland from the Black Sea, forest-covered steep mountainside separated by narrow valleys, with areas of high pasture. The İkizdere is formed from streams running out of the Rize Mountains and continues down to the Black Sea, it is dammed for hydro-electric power and for irrigation. There is snow on the high peaks and much glacial formation. The climate is typical of the Black Sea region i.e. it frequently rains. There is broad-leaf forest at lower elevations and pine higher up.

İkizdere is an agricultural district, growing tea on the hillsides and potatoes in the valley, and now some kiwi fruit are being planted also. Cattle and sheep are grazed on the hillsides, going up to the high pastures (yayla) in summer. Beekeeping is another important source of income, particularly in the village of Anzer. And this very attractive countryside is now attracting tourists, on trekking holidays. However, on the whole İkizdere is not a wealthy region and the younger generations migrate to Turkey's larger cities in search of jobs.

The town of İkizdere is on the river bank,  from the city of Rize on the road to Erzurum.

History
See Rize Province for a history of this area, once part of the Byzantine Empire and later the Empire of Trebizond, during which periods there was a monastery there in İkizdere.

In 67 BCE, Pompey the Great led a Roman military campaign against the Heptakometes today's ikizderelian Ancestors in what is presently known as İkizdere in Turkey’s Rize province. According to the Roman historians who were traveling with the army, the Heptakometes were barbarians living in the İkizdere valley. They were familiar with the effects of Mad Honey, they set out honey pots for the invading army to find. Most of the Roman soldiers consumed the honey and became intoxicated, then they were suddenly attacked and killed by the Heptakometes. Over 1800 Roman soldiers were killed during the attack. Mad Honey was the world's first known biological weapon to be used in battle by Heptakomets.

İkizdere was occupied by Russia for two years during the First World War.

Places of interest
 Merkez Camisi - The central mosque
 The mosque in the village of Şimşirli
 The mosque of Hacı Şeyh in the town of Güneyce
 Güneyce bridge
 The mineral water springs of Şimşirli and Ilıcaköy

There are also a number of interesting wooden houses from the Ottoman period, and many areas of high meadow for walking and trekking, including:
Çağrankaya Plateau
Black Grouse Bird Watching in Sivrikaya 
 the forest area of Çamlık
 the honey-producing Anzer Yaylası  
Ovit and other areas of high pasture

References

Populated places in Rize Province
İkizdere District
Towns in Turkey